William Laidlaw (1914 – 20 October 1941) was a Scottish professional golfer. He finished tied for 7th place in the 1937 Open Championship and won the 1938 Daily Mirror Assistants' Tournament. He was killed during an RAF bombing raid on Bremen, aged 27.

Golf career
Laidlaw was an assistant professional at Gleneagles Hotel (from 1932) and Malden (from 1934) and then with Henry Cotton at Ashridge Golf Club from the start of 1937. He became full professional at West Herts Golf Club in early 1939.

Laidlaw's big win was in the 1938  Daily Mirror Assistants' Tournament at Blackpool North Shore. He scored 289 for the 72 holes and won by 9 strokes from Alan Waters and Geoff White. Later in 1938 he was second in the Czechoslovak Open, although 11 strokes behind the winner, Henry Cotton.

Death
Pilot Officer Laidlaw was killed during an RAF raid on the night of 20/21 October 1941. Laidlaw was in No. 50 Squadron RAF and was involved in a raid on Bremen. He had left RAF Swinderby in a Handley Page Hampden.

Laidlaw married Pamela Mary Tanner, a singer, in 1940. They had a son, William, who was born in 1942.

Tournament wins
1938 Daily Mirror Assistants' Tournament

Results in major championships

Note: Laidlaw only played in The Open Championship.

CUT = missed the half-way cut
"T" indicates a tie for a place

Team appearances
England–Scotland Professional Match (representing Scotland): 1935, 1936, 1938
Triangular Professional Tournament (representing Scotland): 1937 (winners)

References

Scottish male golfers
Royal Air Force officers
Royal Air Force personnel killed in World War II
Sportspeople from Perth, Scotland
1914 births
1941 deaths